Arnold Edward Ortmann (April 8, 1863 – January 3, 1927) was a Prussian-born United States naturalist and zoologist who specialized in malacology.

Biography
Ortmann was born in Magdeburg, Prussia on April 8, 1863. A student of Ernst Haeckel, he graduated from the University of Jena in 1885 with a Ph.D.; he had also studied at the University of Kiel and the University of Strasbourg. From 1886 on, he worked as an instructor at the University of Strasbourg. Together with Haeckel, he participated in an expedition to Zanzibar in 1890/91. Three years later, he emigrated to the United States, where he got a post as the curator of the department of invertebrate paleontology at Princeton University. In 1899, he participated in the Peary Relief expedition, and one year later, he was naturalized as a U.S. citizen.

In 1903, he moved to Pittsburgh. He became the curator of invertebrate zoology at the Carnegie Museum and from 1910 on, he was professor of physical geography at the University of Pittsburgh, where he also obtained in 1911 the additional degree of an Sc.D. In 1925, he became the chair of zoology at the University of Pittsburgh. He died in Pittsburgh on January 3, 1927.

Work
Ortmann's thorough taxonomic studies of freshwater mussels and crustaceans with a special focus on the geographical distribution of species was a fundamental groundwork that is even valid today. In 1920, he formulated "Ortmann's Law of Stream Position", which said that a species of mussels can have a different appearance depending on where in a river system the individuals live:

This observation helped greatly to simplify the taxonomy of molluscs, because previously, researchers had all too often assigned such different morphotypes to different species.

The standard author abbreviation "A.E.Ortmann" is used to indicate Ortmann when citing a botanical name.

Publications
Grundzüge der Marinen Tiergeographie ("Foundations of marine animal geography", 1886)
Continuation of "Die Decapodon" from Bronn's Klassen und Ordnungen des Tierreichs (1898-1900)
Tertiary Invertebrates of the Princeton Expedition to Patagonia (1902)
He was associate editor of American Naturalist for a time, and contributed to periodicals.

References

1863 births
1927 deaths
German malacologists
19th-century German zoologists
German carcinologists
Conchologists
Scientists from Pittsburgh
American malacologists
20th-century American zoologists
American carcinologists
Botanists with author abbreviations
University of Pittsburgh faculty
University of Jena alumni
German emigrants to the United States
Members of the American Philosophical Society